John Hick  (2 July 1815 – 2 February 1894) was a wealthy English industrialist, art collector and Conservative Party politician who sat in the House of Commons from 1868 to 1880, he is associated with the improvement of steam-engines for cotton mills and the work of his firm Hick, Hargreaves and Co. universal in countries where fibre was spun or fabrics woven.

Family
Hick was the eldest son of Benjamin Hick (1790–1842), a civil and mechanical engineer responsible for improvements to the steam-engine, and his wife Elizabeth Routledge (1783–1826), daughter of William Routledge of Elvington Yorkshire. Elizabeth's brother and Hick's uncle, Joshua Routledge (1773–1829) also an engineer living in Bolton, designed the Engineer's Improved Slide Rule and patented improvements to the Rotary steam engine.

Education and early career
Educated at a private school near Alderley, Cheshire and Bolton Grammar School where he received a commercial and classical education, Hick entered Benjamin Hick's Soho Works from school and from a young age, management of the Bolton engineering firm Benjamin Hick and Son with his father. Following Benjamin Hick's death in 1842, Hick became senior partner in the family business, later Hick, Hargreaves, & Co and a member of the Institution of Civil Engineers in 1845.

He was Church Warden for James Slade and warden for St Peter's church Belmont, Lancashire between 1862 and 1874, Governor of Bolton Grammar School, Town councillor for nine years from 1844, a member of the Society of Arts, founder member of the Institution of Mechanical Engineers from 1847 until 1852, member of the London Association of Foreman Engineers and Draughtsman, National Society for Promoting the Education of the Poor in the Principles of the Established Church in England and Wales, Justice of the Peace for the Borough of Bolton and Salford Hundred, liberal patron of the fine arts and a director of the London and North Western Railway under the chairmanship of Sir Richard Moon and Lord Stalbridge, from 1871 until his death.

In 1839, age 23, while working for B. Hick and Son, John Hick Jr as he was referred to at the time, was awarded the silver medal by the Society of Arts for his novel invention of an expanding mandrel for turning lathes, it was an adaptation of a principle developed by Marc Brunel for pulley block manufacture at Portsmouth and received the praise of three eminent engineers; Bryan Donkin, Joshua Field and John Rennie.

During 1842, Hick was awarded a second silver medal by the Society of Arts for his invention of an Elliptograph; conceived in 1840, the device provided a simple and accurate solution for the drawing ellipsoid forms of various proportions.  Hick received further praise from James Nasmyth, William Fairbairn, Joseph Whitworth, and amongst others, Charles Holtzapffel, Chairman of the Committee of Mechanics. Models of both devices were placed in the Society's repository.

Hick contributed a paper to the Institute of Mechanical Engineers in 1849 on a friction clutch for connecting and disconnecting the driving power with shafts and machinery. A B. Hick and Son, 1:12 scale patent model of disconnecting apparatus, for screw propellers, c. 1855 is held in the Science Museum marine engines collection.

Marriage
John Hick married Margaret Bashall (1824–1872), eldest daughter of industrialist William Bashall, partner in Bashall & Boardman of Farington Lodge, near Preston on 24 June 1846, they raised four daughters.

Following Margaret Hick's death in 1872, Hick married the sister of his son-in-law, Rebecca Maria Ashworth (1838–1908), eldest daughter of Edmund Ashworth JP (1800–1881) of Egerton Hall on 16 December 1874 at Holy Trinity Church, Clapham; the couple were married by Margaret Hick's cousin and brother-in-law Reverend William Bashall (1830–1902), Vicar of Deane, Lancashire, by special licence from the Archbishop of Canterbury, Archibald Tait. Edmund Ashworth was a cotton manufacturer, proprietor of E. Ashworth & Sons and Egerton Mill, founder member of the Anti-Corn Law League with his brother Henry Ashworth (1794–1880) JP, in association with John Bright and Richard Cobden (Henry Ashworth's brother-in-law), and supporter of reforming, anti-slavery and peace organisations. The Ashworths are both thought to have been Oswald Millbank in Benjamin Disraeli's novel Coningsby. The two families (Hick and Ashworth) were linked by marriage in 1868 when Hick's first child and eldest daughter Margaret (1847–1929) married Edmund Ashworth Jr (1833–1901). The "highly respected" Reverend Bashall retired to the position of curate at St Barnabas church, Addison Road, Kensington from about 1876 remaining in the area until his death, 1902.

The Great Exhibition

1851 saw the Crystal Palace Exhibition in Hyde Park; early in 1850 Mayor of Bolton, Thomas Lever Rushton (1810–1883) was appointed chairman of a committee to organise the town's efforts toward the Exhibition and presented as a Local Commissioner to Prince Albert at St James's Palace 18 March 1850.

While the family business of Benjamin Hick and Son displayed machinery and engineering models in the Crystal Palace, John Hick also sat as a United Kingdom Juror with the notable figures of Wilhelm Engerth, William Fairbairn, John Farey, Henry Maudslay (1822–1899), grandson of Henry Maudslay, Rev. Henry Moseley and Robert Napier for Class V. Machines for Direct Use, Including Carriages, Railway and Marine Mechanism. Condition 6. of the Exhibition's Decisions Regarding Juries restricted jurors from competing for prizes in the class to which they were appointed; prizes could not be awarded to the individual or the companies the Juror represented.

In 1855, Hick exhibited two pieces from his collection of art works: The Stag Hunt and Lady Jane Grey and Roger Ascham by John Callcott Horsley in the Fine Art Division of the Exposition Universelle (1855) alongside his father-in-law William Bashall who presented The Madrigal, also by Horsley. Hick and Bashall used the same pair again for the 1857 Art Treasures Exhibition in Manchester with Cupid and Psyche by Benjamin West PRA and Crossing the Brook by Paul Falconer Poole.

Hick was a force behind the movement that led to the formation of the 27th Lancashire Rifle Volunteers from the Bolton area, he was offered command, but declined; The Regiment was formed on 15 November 1859 following tensions between the United Kingdom and France and the out break of war between France and the Austrian Empire during April of the same year. William Gray MP JP (1814–1895) and former Mayor of Bolton became Lieutenant Colonel 1 January 1861; John Hick's nephew Benjamin Hick (1845–1882), manager in Hick, Hargreaves & Co, was made a Captain 16 March 1872, resigning his commission about four years later 23 February 1876.

Bolton Iron and Steel Company
In 1860, partners in B. Hick and Son, John Hick and William Hargreaves joined Thomas Lever Rushton's brother-in-law Henry Sharp as partners in Sharp and Eckersley, formerly Rushton and Eckersley before Rushton's retirement from the firm in 1859. The three partners Sharp, Hick and Hargreaves formed the Bolton Iron & Steel Company; situated next door to Rothwell's Union Foundry (on the site of Bolton's old bus station) the company supplied basic metals required by the major manufacturers in the area. Bessemer steel making began about 1860 – four six-ton Bessemer converters were installed during the 1860s, and experiments with the Sieman's open-hearth process began in 1867. Rolling, casting and forging equipment was installed, its products included steel deck beams for ships and sheet metal for shovels, during 1865 Bolton Iron & Steel cast the largest anvil block made in England, weighing 210 tons. By 1869 the company was making open hearth steel and manufacturing steam hammers to the design of Francis Webb. Hick's nephew became a shareholder following incorporation on 9 June 1876.

About 1861 society painter Francis Grant produced portraits of John Hick and his wife Margaret, both works eventually hung together in the family home at Mytton Hall. Hick was an associate of Bolton engineer, artist and photographer Reuben Mitchell (1812–1895), and pursued his own interest in photography, he was also a supporter of the artists Copley Fielding, William Powell Frith, Patrick Nasmyth, Samuel Prout, Edward Matthew Ward and others; the engineer and artist James Nasmyth described John Hick as an "excellent friend".

Hick wrote a history of Timothy Hackworth's locomotive Sans Pareil and presented the restored engine to the Patent Office Museum (now the Science Museum) in 1864, he also photographed William M. Gowland for Bennett Woodcroft. Gowland was driver of Hackworth's Royal George and driver of Sans Pareil at the Rainhill Trials.

Sans Pareil was previously owned by Hick's brother-in-law and eventual business partner John Hargreaves Jr (1800–1874) who had the engine fully repaired and running on the Bolton and Leigh Railway in 1837. Sans Pareil is now housed at the National Railway Museum's Shildon Locomotion Museum annexe.

In 1867, Hick first published a paper, reprinted from The Engineer, 1 June 1866, Experiments on the Friction of the Leather Collars in Hydraulic Presses, that expanded on the work of Dr William Rankine, describing an important series of experiments carried out using a joint invention of Hick and Robert Lüthy (1840–1883), a Swiss engineer employed by Hick, and inventor of a hydraulic cotton packing press. Hick's father was the inventor of the self tightening collar, used universally in hydraulic presses.

Parliament
On 17 November 1868 Hick was elected as Member of Parliament (MP) for Bolton. After election and to avoid a conflict of interest, he immediately resigned his position within Hick, Hargreaves and Co., the firm were already in possession of government contracts, and withdrew from the Bolton Iron and Steel Company. During this period he stayed in St James's, Piccadilly, his wife and daughters remaining at 'Hill Top', Belmont an extensive late 18th century manor house rented from a local family. Hill Top was destroyed by fire in 1909. Hick held the Bolton seat until 24 March 1880 when as a result of ill-health, he chose not to stand for re-election.

Hick was a liberal Conservative in favour of education based on religion, a supporter of the general principles of the Education Act 1870 and an adherent to the view that religious and secular education should not be separated. As a Conservative he was a member of the Carlton, Conservative and St Stephen's Clubs.

He was actively involved in debates about the welfare of people working in factories with steam boilers and in May 1870 chaired a Select Committee to investigate steam boiler explosions; following the report in August 1870, Hick introduced a Bill "...to provide a more efficient remedy to persons injured and property damaged by the explosion of steam boilers through negligence". In April 1871 he seconded a motion by Colonel Barttelot (1820–1893), Conservative MP for Sussex Western 1860–1885, for a Select Committee "...to inquire into the merits of the Martini-Henry Rifle...whether it is the most suitable rifle as compared with others now manufactured to arm our troops with." and debated Supply – Army Estimates, June 1873 drawing attention to  the improvement of heavy ordnance. As a parliamentarian he was frequently consulted by Government on subjects relating to armaments and the construction of boilers for war-vessels.

Hick also served on a Select Committee appointed June 1874 to investigate the testing of chain cable and anchors for the Navy, and debated Railway accidents – the adoption of continuous brakes, June 1879. As a director of LNWR, Hick defended the railway's position, stating he "regarded all automatic machinery with distrust".

About July 1870, Hick was trustee to the estate of former Bolton mayor and MP Stephen Blair with Thomas Lever Rushton, William Hargreaves and others, empowered to build and furnish a 'free hospital for sick persons without limit of domicile'. Blair Hospital, now demolished was built on land donated by former mayor James Knowles at Bromley Cross.

He was Deputy Lieutenant for the County Palatine from 1870 until death and on taking up residence at Mytton Hall, Justice of the Peace for Whalley, Lancashire, he rejoined the Institute of Mechanical Engineers in 1871, proposed by Frederick Bramwell and elected a Member of Council in 1872, a Vice-President of the institute from 1874 to 1876.

For his contribution to the 1873 International Exhibition at South Kensington Hick was presented with a bronze medal, he was a member of the Permanent Committee for the Representation for British Pictures for the 1874 International Exhibition with fellow MPs Henry Bolckow, Alexander Brown, Henry Eaton, Joshua Fielden, William Graham, John Snowdon Henry, John Pender and others.

Hick became an executor for the estate of John Hargreaves in March 1875, following Hargreaves' death at Silwood Park, Sunninghill in December 1874.

On 15 March 1879, towards the end of his time as an MP, John Hick along with C.D. Abel, Colonel Frederick Beaumont (1833–1899) Liberal MP for South Durham 1868–1880, F. Bolton, Alexander Brogden JP (1825–1892) of John Brogden and Sons, Liberal MP 1868–1885 for Wednesbury, J.T. Jones and J. Turay registered the Aqueous Works and Diamond Rock-boring Company (Limited), Crown Works, Guildford Street, York Road, Lambeth. The company "...bought out and patented the system of using diamonds for boring", Hick was elected a member of the Iron and Steel Institute the same year. The Aqueous Works and Diamond Rock-boring Company liquidated about 1892.

Pollution trial
After leaving parliament Hick and Lt-Col. Ralph John Aspinall JP, DL, campaigned against the pollution and poisoning of salmon and trout in the River Ribble and its tributaries by local industry; Hick raised the issue of pollution in the Ribble during the third reading of the Rivers Pollution Prevention Act 1876. Aspinall and Hick fought a publicised and successful legal battle in the Court of Chancery against the cotton mills of Mitchell and Carlisle during July 1880 leading to a landmark judgement that set a precedent for controlling environmental pollution.

The river ran close to Mytton Hall where landlord Aspinall held the fishing rights and John Hick was lessee from 1874. The trial was presided over by the Vice-Chancellor of England, Sir James Bacon. In December 1880 Hick and Aspinall received presentations at Mytton Hall from the local angling community in recognition of "...their services in preventing pollution to the River Ribble and its tributaries".

Science Museum
During 1887 Hick was a member of the mechanical collections committee chaired by John Slagg, MP with other experts and politicians; Sir William Armstrong, Sir Joseph Bazelgette, James Brunlees, Edward Cowper, Professor T. M. Goodeve, Sir Charles Gregory, James Howard, MP, Charles Manby, John Hinde Palmer, Sir Edward Reed, MP and Sir Bernhard Samuelson, MP established with several committees for the purpose of advising a central committee appointed by the Treasury to investigate the forming of a Science Museum and National Gallery of Portraits in South Kensington, situated between the Natural History Museum and what was to be the Imperial Institute.

Death

Hick died at the age of 78 after some months of failing health when living at Mytton Hall, Whalley, Lancashire and Lezayre, Isle of Man, where he was also a Justice of the Peace.

Like his father Benjamin, John Hick accumulated a large and valuable collection of art works, some of which was inherited, others purchased from the auction of Benjamin Hick's estate in 1843, and devoted his final years at Mytton Hall to compiling an elaborately illustrated catalogue of the collection; some of these works were auctioned by Christie's during June and July 1909 following Rebecca Hick's death in 1908. The Hick library at Mytton Hall was dispersed at Capes Dunne & Co. Manchester in November 1909.

From the year of his death the London North Western Railway (LNWR) produced 10 steam locomotives of the John Hick Class (1894–1912); a Francis Webb design of 2-2-2-2 configuration, engine No. 20 named John Hick. The following 9 engines were named after engineers and inventors, principally from the industrial and Second industrial revolution: No. 1505 Richard Arkwright, No. 1512 Henry Cort, No. 1534 William Froude, No. 1535 Henry Maudslay, No. 1536 Hugh Myddelton, No. 1548 John Penn, No. 1549 John Rennie, No. 1557 Thomas Savery and No. 1559 William Siemens.

Hick was unique in that he was the only LNWR director to have a locomotive class named after him in memoriam.

Following withdrawal of the John Hick Class in 1912, during the month of the anniversary of Hick's death, February 1913, 5 of 6 names were transferred to the LNWR George the Fifth Class, locomotive No. 752 named John Hick, serving up to 1935 with the London Midland and Scottish Railway (LMS).

See also
George Forrester and Company
Johann Georg Bodmer
Gerasim Ivanovich Khludov

References

External links
 Science Museum Diagrammatic model in wood of Hick's rotary engine, 1843.
 Institute of Mechanical Engineers Model high pressure two-cylinder horizontal Hick saw-mill engine c.1845, built by John Hick.
 Science Museum Studio portrait photograph of John Hick by Maull and Polyblank, c.1860.
 Hansard 1803–2005 Contributions to Parliament by John Hick.

1815 births
1894 deaths
People from Bolton
People educated at Bolton School
Politics of the Metropolitan Borough of Bolton
British art collectors
British mechanical engineers
English art collectors
English patrons of the arts
Book and manuscript collectors
UK MPs 1868–1874
UK MPs 1874–1880
Conservative Party (UK) MPs for English constituencies
Foundrymen
Locomotive builders and designers
British steam engine engineers
Millwrights
English railway mechanical engineers
Engineers from Greater Manchester
English mechanical engineers
English inventors
Businesspeople in steel
Fellows of the Institution of Mechanical Engineers
Deputy Lieutenants in England
Deputy Lieutenants of Lancashire
19th-century English politicians
19th-century British engineers
People of the Industrial Revolution
People of the Victorian era
English justices of the peace